Asian Highway 67 (AH67) is a road in the Asian Highway Network running  from Kuytun, Xinjiang, China to Jezkazgan, Kazakhstan connecting AH5 to AH62. The route is as follows:

China
 : Kuytun - Karamay - Sanping
 : Sanping - Tacheng
 : Tacheng - Baketu

Kazakhstan
 A8 Highway: Bakhty - Taskesken
 A3 Highway: Taskesken - Kalbatay
 M38 Highway: Kalbatay - Semey - Pavlodar
 A17 Highway: Pavlodar - Karaganda - Jezkazgan

Asian Highway Network
Roads in Kazakhstan
Roads in China
Roads in Xinjiang